Mir EP-2 was a visiting expedition to the Mir space station conducted in June 1988 by cosmonauts Anatoly Solovyev, Viktor Savinykh and Aleksandr Aleksandrov. Launched aboard the Soyuz TM-5 spacecraft, the crew spent ten days in space before returning to Earth aboard Soyuz TM-4. The mission occurred while the EO-3 crew were aboard Mir.

Solovyev commanded the mission, with Savinykh as his flight engineer, while Bulgarian Aleksandr Panayatov Aleksandrov flew as a research cosmonaut. Aleksandrov was the second Bulgarian to fly in space, the first being Georgi Ivanov, who flew on Soyuz 33. Ivanov failed to reach the Salyut 6 space station as his mission was aborted prior to docking due to an engine failure aboard his spacecraft Soyuz 33. As a result, prior to EP-2, Bulgaria was the only Eastern European Soviet ally to not have one of its citizens visit a Soviet space station.

Crew

Experiments
During his visit, Aleksandrov used nearly 2,000 kg of equipment delivered by Progress spacecraft to conduct 46 experiments in the Shipka programme.

Landing
The visiting EP-2 crew returned to Earth about a week later in the spacecraft Soyuz TM-4, leaving TM-5 as the station's lifeboat.

References

1988 in the Soviet Union
1988 in spaceflight
Mir
Bulgaria–Soviet Union relations